Ogdensburg Armory is a historic National Guard armory building located at Ogdensburg in St. Lawrence County, New York. It was built in 1898 and designed by State architect Isaac G. Perry.  It consists of a 2-story, hip-roofed administration building and a large gable-roofed drill shed.  It is built of load-bearing, reddish-brown Potsdam sandstone walls built upon a raised, rusticated, light-gray limestone foundation. The main block features 5-, 4-, and -story towers.

It was listed on the National Register of Historic Places in 1995.

References

Buildings and structures in St. Lawrence County, New York
Armories on the National Register of Historic Places in New York (state)
Government buildings completed in 1898
Military installations established in 1898
National Register of Historic Places in St. Lawrence County, New York